is a 1958 Japanese mystery film directed by Seijun Suzuki for the Nikkatsu Corporation. It is based on a novel by mystery writer Seichō Matsumoto.

Cast 
 Yôko Minamida as Asako Takahashi
 Toshio Takahara as Shigeo Kotani
 Hideaki Nitani as Hiroshi Ishikawa
 Nobuo Kaneko as Kawai
 Shinsuke Ashida as Muraoka
 Joe Shishido as Hamazaki

References

External links
 Japan Foundation notes at Cinefiles
 
 
 Voice Without a Shadow  at the Japanese Movie Database

1958 films
1950s Japanese-language films
1950s mystery films
Films based on Japanese novels
Films directed by Seijun Suzuki
Nikkatsu films
1950s Japanese films